Thalassotalea crassostreae  is a Gram-negative, aerobic and rod-shaped bacterium from the genus of Thalassotalea which has been isolated from the oyster Crassostrea gigas from the Yeongheung Island in South Korea.

References

External links
Type strain of Thalassotalea crassostreae at BacDive -  the Bacterial Diversity Metadatabase

 

Alteromonadales
Bacteria described in 2017